Willard House or Willard Homestead may refer to:

in the United States (by state)
Willard House (Cottonwood, Arizona), listed on the National Register of Historic Places (NRHP) in Arizona 
Willard Homestead (Newington, Connecticut), NRHP-listed
Frances Willard House (Evanston, Illinois), a U.S. National Historic Landmark
Leroy R. Willard House, Marshalltown, Iowa, NRHP-listed
George Willard House, Jefferson, Maryland, NRHP-listed
Willard House and Clock Museum, Grafton, Massachusetts, NRHP-listed
Willard-Fisk House, Holden, Massachusetts, NRHP-listed
Willard Homestead (Harrisville, New Hampshire), NRHP-listed
Dr. Sylvester Willard Mansion, Auburn, New York, listed on the NRHP in Cayuga County, New York
Frances Willard House (Chattanooga, Tennessee), listed on the NRHP in Tennessee
Willard-Clark House, Maryville, Tennessee, listed on the NRHP in Tennessee
Emma Willard House, Middlebury, Vermont, NRHP-listed
Willard Building (Longview, Washington), listed on the NRHP in Washington 
Willard Hotel, Washington, D.C., NRHP-listed
Frances Willard Schoolhouse, Janesville, Wisconsin, NRHP-listed
Willard House (Deerfield, Massachusetts), historic home of Samuel Willard

See also
Frances Willard House (disambiguation)